Kazuki Miburo (壬生狼 一輝, born 28 September 2001) is a Japanese kickboxer. He is the former Krush Bantamweight champion.

Combat Press ranks him as the #6 strawweight in the world, as of August 2021. Between April and July 2021, he was ranked as the #9 Flyweight kickboxer in the world.

Kickboxing career

Early career
Miburo fought Eiki Kurata at Krush-EX 2020 vol.1, as a short notice replacement for Rikiya Suzuki, who was forced to withdraw due to a training injury. Miburo won the fight by unanimous decision.

Miburo was scheduled to make his K-1 debut at K-1 World GP 2020 in Fukuoka, being scheduled to fight Koki Tomimura. He won the fight by a split decision.

Miburo was scheduled to fight Hinata Matsumoto at Krush 121. He won the fight by majority decision.

Krush bantamweight champion
He was scheduled to fight Begin Yoshioka at Krush 123, for the Krush Bantamweight title. Miburo won the fight by a majority decision.

Miburo was scheduled to take part in the K-1's eight-man Japan Bantamweight Grand Prix. He would face Aoi Noda in the quarterfinal bout. He would overcome Aoi Noda in the quarterfinals and Naoki Omura in the semifinals by decision, before losing to Toma Kuroda by knockout in the finals.

Miburo was scheduled to face Toma Kuroda at K-1 World GP 2021 Japan on December 4, 2021. They fought just five months prior, in the finals of the K-1 Japan Bantamweight Tournament, which Miburo lost by a first-round knockout. Miburo lost the fight by unanimous decision, after an extra round was fought.

Miburo was booked to make his first Krush bantamweight title defense against Koji Ikeda at Krush 135 on March 26, 2022. He lost the fight by majority decision.

Later bantamweight career
Miburo faced Daiki Mine at K-1 World GP 2022 in Fukuoka on August 11, 2022. He successfully snapped his three-fight losing strea, as he won the fight by unanimous decision, with all three judges awarding him a 30–29 scorecard.

Miburo took part in the 2022 K-1 Bantamweight World Grand Prix, which was held at K-1 World GP 2022 in Osaka on December 3, 2022. He was booked to face the three-sport World Kickboxing Network champion Samvel Babayan in the quarterfinals of the one-day tournament. Miburo won the fight by unanimous decision, with two scorecards of 30–29 and one scorecard of 30–28. He advanced to the tournament semifinals, where he faced the 2021 K-1 Japan Grand Prix winner Toma Kuroda. He lost the fight by majority decision, with scores of 30–30, 30–29 and 30–28.

Championships and accomplishments
Amateur
 2013 All Japan Jr. Kick -30kg Runner-up
 2014 TRIBELATE -35kg Champion

Professional
 2019 Yamato Bantamweight Champion
 2021 Krush Bantamweight (-53kg) Champion
 2021 K-1 World GP Japan Bantamweight Tournament Runner-up

Fight record

|-  style="background:#fbb"
| 2022-12-03|| Loss ||align=left| Toma Kuroda ||  K-1 World GP 2022 in Osaka Bantamweight World Grand Prix, Semi Final || Osaka, Japan || Decision (Majority) || 3 || 3:00
|-  style="background:#cfc"
| 2022-12-03|| Win ||align=left| Samvel Babayan ||  K-1 World GP 2022 in Osaka Bantamweight World Grand Prix, Quarter Final || Osaka, Japan ||Decision (Unanimous) || 3 || 3:00
|-  style="background:#cfc"
| 2022-08-11|| Win ||align=left| Daiki Mine ||  K-1 World GP 2022 in Fukuoka || Fukuoka, Japan || Decision (Unanimous) || 3 || 3:00
|-  style="background:#fbb;"
| 2022-03-26 || Loss|| align=left| Koji Ikeda || Krush 135 || Tokyo, Japan || Decision (Majority)|| 3 || 3:00 
|-
! style=background:white colspan=9 |
|-  style="text-align:center; background:#fbb"
| 2021-12-04 || Loss || align=left| Toma Kuroda || K-1 World GP 2021 in Osaka || Osaka, Japan || Ext.R Decision (Unanimous)  ||4  ||3:00 
|-
|-  style="background:#fbb;"
| 2021-05-30|| Loss || align=left| Toma Kuroda || K-1 World GP 2021: Japan Bantamweight Tournament, Final || Tokyo, Japan || KO (Left Cross)  || 1 || 0:31
|-  style="background:#cfc;"
| 2021-05-30|| Win || align=left| Naoki Omura || K-1 World GP 2021: Japan Bantamweight Tournament, Semi Final || Tokyo, Japan || Ext.R Decision (Unanimous) ||4  ||3:00
|-  style="background:#cfc;"
| 2021-05-30|| Win || align=left| Aoi Noda || K-1 World GP 2021: Japan Bantamweight Tournament, Quarter Final || Tokyo, Japan || Decision (Split) || 3 || 3:00
|-  style="background:#cfc;"
| 2021-03-27 || Win || align=left| Begin Yoshioka || Krush 123 || Tokyo, Japan || Decision (Majority) || 3 || 3:00
|-
! style=background:white colspan=9 |
|-  style="background:#cfc;"
| 2021-01-23 || Win || align=left| Hinata Matsumoto || Krush 121 || Tokyo, Japan || Decision (Majority) || 3 || 3:00
|-
|-  style="background:#cfc;"
| 2020-11-02 || Win || align=left| Koki || K-1 World GP 2020 in Fukuoka || Fukuoka, Japan || Decision (Split) || 3 || 3:00
|-
|-  style="background:#cfc;"
| 2020-08-22 || Win || align=left| Eiki Kurata || Krush-EX 2020 vol.1 || Tokyo, Japan || Decision (Unanimous) || 3 || 3:00
|-
|-  style="background:#cfc;"
| 2019-11-17 || Win ||align=left| Hiruto Nozaki || Yamato 18|| Aka, Fukuoka ||  Decision || 3 || 3:00 
|-
! style=background:white colspan=9 |
|-  style="background:#cfc;"
| 2019-04-21 || Win ||align=left| Shin Hee Chan || Yamato 17|| Aka, Fukuoka ||   ||  ||
|-  style="background:#cfc;"
| 2018-11-25 || Win ||align=left| Shohei Nishibayashi || Yamato 15 || Aka, Fukuoka || Decision || 3 || 3:00
|-  style="background:#cfc;"
| 2018-04-15 || Win ||align=left| Naofumi Taguchi || Yamato 14|| Aka, Fukuoka || Decision || 3 || 3:00
|-  style="background:#cfc;"
| 2017-11-19 || Win ||align=left| Hiruto Nozaki || Yamato 13|| Aka, Fukuoka ||   ||  || 
|-
| colspan=9 | Legend:    

|-  style="background:#fbb;"
| 2018-07-29|| Loss || align=left| Aoi Noda || K-1 Koshien 2018 -55kg Tournament, Second Round|| Tokyo, Japan || Decision (Split) ||1 ||2:00
|-  style="background:#cfc;"
| 2018-07-29|| Win|| align=left| Tsubasa Yamawaki || K-1 Koshien 2018, -55kg Tournament First Round|| Tokyo, Japan || Decision (Split)||1 ||2:00
|-  style="background:#cfc;"
| 2017-07-16|| Win|| align=left| Futa Inumaru || Peter Aerts Spirit All Japan Kyushu Selection|| Fukuoka, Japan || Decision (Unanimous)||2 ||2:00
|-  style="background:#fbb;"
| 2015-09-13 || Loss ||align=left| Kem Kiatkanpong || Suk Wan Kingtong || Thailand || TKO (Knee)|| 2 ||
|-  style="background:#fbb;"
| 2014-12-21 || Loss ||align=left| Asahi Shinagawa || WINDY SPORTS || Tokyo, Japan || Decision || 5 ||  
|-
! style=background:white colspan=9 |
|-  style="background:#fbb;"
| 2013-03-31 || Loss ||align=left| Arato Iyama || 3rd All Japan Jr. Kick -30kg Tournament Final || Tokyo, Japan || Decision || 3|| 2:00 
|-
! style=background:white colspan=9 |
|-  style="background:#cfc;"
| 2013-03-31 || Win ||align=left| Reito Komiyama || 3rd All Japan Jr. Kick -30kg Tournament Semi Final || Tokyo, Japan || Decision || 2|| 2:00
|-  style="background:#cfc;"
| 2013-03-31 || Win ||align=left| || 3rd All Japan Jr. Kick -30kg Tournament Quarter Final || Tokyo, Japan || Decision || 2|| 2:00
|-  style="background:#fbb;"
| 2013-02-10 || Loss ||align=left| Takito Tamaru || All Japan Jr. Kick Kyushu Selection Tournament -30kg Final || Fukuoka, Japan || Decision || 3|| 2:00
|-  style="background:#cfc;"
| 2013-02-10 || Win ||align=left| Shoma Ideguchi || All Japan Jr. Kick Kyushu Selection Tournament -30kg Semi Final || Fukuoka, Japan || Decision || 2|| 2:00
|-  style="background:#cfc;"
| 2013-02-10 || Win ||align=left| Yuto Ideguchi || All Japan Jr. Kick Kyushu Selection Tournament -30kg Semi Final || Fukuoka, Japan || Decision || 2|| 2:00 
|-
| colspan=9 | Legend:

See also
 List of male kickboxers

References

Living people
2001 births
Japanese male kickboxers
Flyweight kickboxers
Sportspeople from Fukuoka Prefecture